Denham Aerodrome  is an operational general aviation aerodrome located  east of Gerrards Cross, near Denham, Buckinghamshire, England. It lies beneath Heathrow's Class D airspace London CTR. VFR entry/exit points are at Maple Cross (CHT) and St Giles Church.  Entry lanes and circuit height are at  MSL. It has one paved runway, aligned 06/24, a grass runway also aligned 06/24 which is referred to as the northside grass and one grass runway aligned 12/30. It also has substantial hangarage.

Denham Aerodrome has a CAA Ordinary Licence (Number P646) that allows flights for the public transport of passengers or for flying instruction as authorised by the licensee (Bickertons Aerodromes Limited).

History

There are records that flying has been taking place at Denham Aerodrome since the 1900s.  During the First World War in 1915, RAF Denham was established as a flying training school for Flight Cadets.

The airfield was first licensed as a private use airfield to Squadron Leader J. M. Bickerton by the CAA on 19 May 1938. During the Second World War, the airfield was used again as a training school. The largest based aircraft was a Douglas DC-3 of Gregory Air Services and occasional airshows have been staged here. 
The airfield was the home to one of the earliest parachuting clubs in the UK, starting in 1955 the "British Parachute Club" was based here until May 1956 when they moved to Blackbushe Airport in Hampshire. The club at Denham was run by instructor Dumbo Willans and also known as the "No. 1 Civil Parachute Training School".

Services 
Presently, there are a number of charter and flight instruction and filming operators based at Denham Aerodrome as well as a helicopter maintenance facility. The Pilot Center flying school, HeliAir, TAA UK, Aerospace Design Facilities, AS Aerospace Ltd, FlyingTV Ltd, Helicopter Film Services, JetFly. A restaurant near the control tower is named "Biggles", after the fictional airman of that name, there is also a small café called "The Crew Room" on the north side of the airfield.

Historical Units
 No. 21 Elementary Flight Training School.
 No. 125 Elementary Gliding School.
 No. 125 Gliding School.

References

External links

Airports in England
Airports in the London region
Transport in Buckinghamshire
Airports established in 1915
Denham, Buckinghamshire